Rodney Charles Watt (2 January 1895 – 29 May 1967) was an Australian rules footballer who played with Essendon in the Victorian Football League (VFL).

Brother of Essendon’s Rowley Watt.

Notes

External links 

1895 births
1967 deaths
Australian rules footballers from Victoria (Australia)
Essendon Football Club players
South Bendigo Football Club players